Equality and diversity is a term used in the United Kingdom to define and champion equality, diversity and human rights as defining values of society. It promotes equality of opportunity for all, giving every individual the chance to achieve their potential, free from prejudice and discrimination. 

UK legislation requires public authorities to promote equality in everything that they do, also making sure that other organisations meet their legal duties to promote equality while also doing so themselves.

In the UK under the Equality Act 2010 there are certain legal requirements under existing legislation to promote equality in the areas of nine protected characteristics. These are often collectively referred to as the general duties to promote equality.

As the independent advocate for equality and human rights in Britain, a Commission of Equality and Human Rights (EHRC) exists that aims to reduce inequality, eliminate discrimination, strengthen good relations between people and promote and protect human rights. EHRC has a duty to challenge prejudice and disadvantage and promote the importance of human rights, enforcing equality laws on age, disability, gender, gender reassignment, race, religion or belief and sexual orientation and encourage compliance with the Human Rights Act.

Requirements and duties

The requirements to eliminate unlawful sex discrimination and harassment also include discrimination and harassment on the basis of gender reassignment.

It follows that:

Equality and discrimination
Age

It is unlawful for age to be the cause of less favourable treatment in a workplace or in vocational training, unless there is an objective justification for doing so.
Where this is referred to, it refers to a person belonging to a particular age (e.g. 32 year olds) or range of ages (e.g. 18 - 30 year olds).

Disability

If one has a physical or mental impairment, that person has specific rights that protect them against discrimination. Employers and service providers are obliged to make relevant adjustments. Under certain circumstances this protection also extends to their carers 
A person has a disability if s/he has a physical or mental impairment which has a substantial and long-term adverse effect on that person's ability to carry out normal day-to-day activities.

Gender reassignment

The process of transitioning from one gender to another.

Marriage and civil partnership

Marriage is defined as a 'union between a man and a woman'. Same-sex couples can have their relationships legally recognised as 'civil partnerships'. Civil partners must be treated the same as married couples on a wide range of legal matters.

Pregnancy and maternity

Pregnancy is the condition of being pregnant or expecting a baby. Maternity refers to the period after the birth, and is linked to maternity leave in the employment context. In the non-work context, protection against maternity discrimination is for 26 weeks after giving birth, and this includes treating a woman unfavourably because she is breastfeeding.

Race

Refers to the protected characteristic of Race. It refers to a group of people defined by their race, colour, and nationality (including citizenship) ethnic or national origins.
Wherever one was born, wherever their parents came from, whatever the colour of their skin, they have a right to be treated fairly and be protected against racial discrimination and prejudice.

Religion and belief

Religion has the meaning usually given to it but belief includes religious and philosophical beliefs including lack of belief (e.g. Atheism). Generally, a belief should affect your life choices or the way you live for it to be included in the definition.
Religion or belief should not interfere with anybody’s right to be treated fairly at work, at school, in shops or while accessing public services such as health care and housing.

Sex

Whether a person's sexual attraction is towards their own sex, the opposite sex or to both sexes.
Whether one is straight, gay, lesbian or bisexual should not put them at a disadvantage. The law protects the citizen against discrimination in the workplace, including harassment, on grounds of sexual orientation.

You can see a more in-depth definition of these protected characteristics on the Office of Public Sector Information website.

See also
British labour law
Gender equality
Gender inequality
Disability
Equal pay for women
Mental Health
Human Rights
Antiracism
Antisemitism
Political correctness
Multiculturalism

References
Acts of the UK Parliament (with explanatory notes) – website includes the following viewable documents:
Equality Act 2010
Equality Act 2006
Equal Pay Act 1970
Sex Discrimination Act 1975
Race Relations Act 1976 and Amendment 2000
The Race Relations Act 1976 (Amendment) Regulations 2003
Disability Discrimination Act 1995
Employment Act 2002
Employment Equality (Age) Regulations 2006
Employment Equality (Sexual Orientation) Regulations 2003
Employment Equality (Religion or Belief) Regulations 2003
Race Relations Act 1976 (c. 74) (UK Statute Law Database, Ministry of Justice, 1976)
Race Relations (Amendment) Act 2000 (Office of Public Sector Information, 30 November 2000)
Council Directive 2000/43/EC of 29 June 2000 implementing the principle of equal treatment between persons irrespective of racial or ethnic origin, the Equality Framework Directive 2000 (text in all EU languages)
New European Framework Equal Treatment Directive examined (2001)

External links

Equality and Human Rights Commission - The EHRC brings together the work of the three provision Commissions, the Commission for Racial Equality (CRE), Disability Rights Commission (DRC) and Equal Opportunities Commission (EOC)
Health Information Plus Website - Quality assured health information for patients, carers and the public with evaluated information sources including: NHS Scotland, BBC Health, and published healthcare research.
The Picker Institute Europe - undertakes a combination of research, development and policy activity within the healthcare sector.
Stonewall - campaigns on behalf of the Lesbian, Gay, Bisexual and Transgender community in the UK. It produces a broad range of useful information, research and other resources.
Improvement and Development Agency for local government (IDeA) - works for local government improvement and looks into Equality issues and policies. It is owned by the UK's Local Government Association and belongs to local government.
Equality and Human Rights in the NHS (Healthcare)
Department of Health, Investigations on racial Equality (September 2007)
United Nations- Universal Declaration of Human Rights
United Nations- Human Rights
Office of the High Commissioner for Human Rights
The Universal Human Rights Index of United Nations documents

Politics of the United Kingdom
Affirmative action in Europe